Lalita or Lalitha may refer to:

Hinduism 
 Tripura Sundari, or Lalita, a goddess in Shaktism
 Lalita (gopi), a figure in Krishna tradition

Film
 Lalita (1949 film), an Indian folklore Oriya film 
 Lalitha (film), a 1976 Tamil film
 Lalita (1984 film), an Indian Bengali film

People
 Lalitha (actress) (1930–1982), Indian actress
 Lalita Babar (born 1989), Indian long-distance runner
 Lalita D. Gupte (fl. from 1971), India banker
 Lalita Iyer (fl. from 2004), Indian writer 
 Lalitha Kumaramangalam (born 1958), Indian politician
 Lalitha Kumari (born 1967), Indian film actress
 Lalitha Kumari (pastor) (1942–2013), Indian priest
 Lalita Lajmi (born 1932), Indian painter
 Lalitha Lenin (born 1946), Indian poet
 Lalita Panyopas (born 1971), Thai actress
 Lalita Pawar (1916–1998), Indian actress
 Lalitha Rajapakse (1900–1976), Ceylonese lawyer and politician
 Lalita Ramakrishnan (born 1959), American microbiologist 
 Lalitha Ravish (fl. from 2015), Indian politician 
 Lalita Sehrawat (born 1994), Indian wrestler
 Lalita Shastri (1910–1993), wife of former Indian prime minister Lal Bahadur Shastri
 Lalitha Sivakumar, Indian Carnatic music teacher and composer
 Lalita Yadav (born 1961), Indian politician
 Lalita Yauhleuskaya (born 1963), Belarusian sports shooter

Other uses
 Lalitha (raga), a Carnatic musical framework

See also
 Lolita (disambiguation)
 Lalita Gauri Mandir, a temple in Varanasi, India
 Lalita Sahasranama, a Hindu text from the Brahmanda Purana
 Lalitavistara Sūtra, a Mahayana Buddhist scripture
 Lalitha Mahal, a palace in Mysore
 Lalithasree (born 1957), Indian film actress